Dr.  Abubakar Jaar (died in Padang, 22 March 1985 at the age of 86 years) was a civil servant and lawyer for the Dutch East Indies. After the independence of Indonesia, he was mayor of Padang and resident of North Sumatra replacing Luat Siregar and resident of West Sumatra.

Before independence, Abubakar Jaar was a teacher at the Islamic High School (STI) Padang which was founded by Mahmud Yunus. He became one of the founders of the Padang Regional People's Representative Council which was founded at the suggestion of Sukarno to reduce the impact of the war during the Japanese occupation of the Dutch East Indies.

Aboebakar Djaar was one of the founders of the Pancasila Law College which became the forerunner of Faculty of Law, Andalas University.  He died in Padang, Friday, March 22, 1985. After suffering from diabetes for a long time. His body was buried at Pandang City Hall after being handed over by the Governor of West Sumatra, Ir. Azwar Anas to the Mayor of Padang Syahrul Ujud, S.H. He left behind a wife and three children.

References

External links 
 

Mayors of Padang
Minangkabau people
Mayors of places in Indonesia
1985 deaths